Acrolepiopsis brevipennella is a moth of the family Acrolepiidae. It was described by Sigeru Moriuti in 1972. It is found in Taiwan.

References

Moths described in 1972
Acrolepiidae